KFCW (93.1 FM) is a radio station broadcasting a classic rock format. Licensed to Riverton, Wyoming, United States, the station is currently owned by Jerry and Steve Edwards, through licensee Edwards Communications, LC, and features programming from Westwood One's Classic Rock network and AP Radio. The station is an affiliate of the syndicated Pink Floyd program "Floydian Slip."

Translators
In addition to the main station, KFCW is relayed by an additional translator to widen its broadcast area.

Previous logo

References

External links
 KFCW Facebook
 Official Website
 

FCW
Classic rock radio stations in the United States
Riverton, Wyoming
1984 establishments in Wyoming
Radio stations established in 1984